Djaty I (also Djati) was a prince who lived in the ancient Egypt during the 4th Dynasty. He was an overseer of a royal expedition.

Djaty was a son of Queen Meresankh II, daughter of King Khufu. Djaty's sisters were Nefertkau III and Nebty-tepites.

Because Djaty had the title King's son of his body (za-nesut khetef, zꜣ-nswt ẖt.f), it is assumed he was a son of one pharaoh. It is known that Meresankh II married a king after death of her first husband Horbaef. This king would be a father of Djaty – either Djedefre or Khafre. On the other hand, Djaty maybe had his title because he was a grandson of Khufu.

Djaty was married and had a son Djaty II. It is possible that he had more sons.

After his death, Djaty was buried in the tomb known as G 7810. This is a mastaba at Giza. In the tomb, his wife and son are depicted. Djaty II is described as the eldest son of Djaty I.

See also
 Egyptian Fourth Dynasty family tree

References

Princes of the Fourth Dynasty of Egypt